Remains to Be Seen is a play written by Howard Lindsay and Russel Crouse. Producer Leland Hayward opened it on Broadway at the Morosco Theatre on October 3, 1951. Bretaigne Windust directed the production, which ran for 199 performances.

The play is a comedy about the investigation of the murder of an anti-pornography crusader. Following his death, various characters gather at his Park Avenue apartment, including his niece Jody, his attorney, his butler, the apartment building's young janitor, and a doctor. In the process, the attorney falls in love with Jody, but she chooses to leave with the janitor instead.

Cast and characters
The characters and opening night cast from the Broadway production are given below:

Adaptations
Metro-Goldwyn-Mayer adapted the play as a film of the same name in 1953, directed by Don Weis. June Allyson starred as Jody.

References

External links
 

1951 plays
American plays adapted into films
Broadway plays
Comedy plays
Plays set in New York City